Thundersticks, sometimes known as bambams, are long, narrow plastic balloons that are used as promotional noise makers. The noise is created when two thundersticks are struck together. They are most often used at sporting events.

Origin and popularity 
Thundersticks, known as makdae pungseon in South Korea, were created by BalloonStix Korea and first used in 1994 at an LG Twins baseball game. They later gained popularity in North America when they were used by fans of the Anaheim Angels during the 2002 World Series. Today thundersticks are used by fans of many sports teams in order to show their support, serving a similar purpose as the Homer Hanky associated with the Minnesota Twins and the Terrible Towel associated with the Pittsburgh Steelers.

Thundersticks have appeared around the world at many sporting events. They are regularly seen in baseball games in Taiwan, basketball games in the Philippines, and football matches throughout Europe, but sometimes under different names such as  "bangers".

See also 
 Boomwhacker
 Handy horn
 Homer Hanky
 Inflatable
 List of inflatable manufactured goods
 Terrible Towel
 Vuvuzela

References

External links 
 

Anaheim Angels
Balloons (entertainment)
Inflatable manufactured goods
South Korean inventions
Sports paraphernalia